"Harden My Heart" is a song by rock group Quarterflash, written by their guitarist Marv Ross.  It is a million-selling Gold-certified single and was featured on the band's Platinum-selling Quarterflash album, released in 1981.

The song was originally released as a single in early 1980 by Seafood Mama, Quarterflash's predecessor band. It featured more sparse instrumentation but a more dramatic vocal arrangement than the hit version and was a regional success on radio stations in Portland, Oregon.  The record's video features theatrics in and around an office trailer with dark corridors and swinging Metal Halide light bulbs from the ceiling before it was bulldozed and torched.

After changing their name, Quarterflash released their self-titled debut album in 1981 which contained the new version of "Harden My Heart". This power ballad version was released as the album's first single. In early 1982, it reached  3 on the Billboard Hot 100 and also reached No. 1 on the Billboard Hot Mainstream Rock Tracks chart. The song also charted in Germany, New Zealand, Australia and the UK. It was the group's only top-ten pop single in the United States, although the follow-up single from the album, "Find Another Fool", and the 1983 hit "Take Me to Heart" both entered the top 20. It reached No. 41 on the U.S. Adult Contemporary chart.

This song is included in the video game Grand Theft Auto: Vice City Stories, on radio station Emotion 98.3 and was played twice in the pilot episode of Knight Rider. The song is used in the 2001 film Wet Hot American Summer, which is set in 1981.

Julianne Hough and Mary J. Blige sing this song in the film Rock of Ages.

An excerpt of this song is also heard in the opening scene of the pilot episode of The Americans, a 2013 television series aired on the FX cable channel. The series is set in United States in 1981.

Background

Guitarist and songwriter Marv Ross said,

The first version was recorded by Seafood Mama in the band members' basement in Portland in 1980. After changing their name to Quarterflash and getting signed to Geffen, they re-recorded the song at the Record Plant in Los Angeles. Ross said the re-recording had a better guitar solo, as well as better sound quality in general.

Personnel
Rindy Ross: Vocals, Saxophone 
Marv Ross: Guitars
Jack Charles: Guitars, vocals
Rick DiGiallonardo: Keyboards
Rich Gooch: Bass
Brian David Willis: Drums, percussion

Charts

Weekly charts

Year-end charts

See also
List of Billboard Mainstream Rock number-one songs of the 1980s

References

1981 songs
1981 debut singles
Quarterflash songs
1980s ballads
Rock ballads
Geffen Records singles